S&T can refer to:
 Science and technology, the counterpart of R&D
 Shell and tube - type of heat exchanger
 Missouri University of Science and Technology, often shortened to "Missouri S&T" or simply "S&T"
 Signalling and Telecommunications or Signalling and Telegraphy in Railway signalling
 S&T Dynamics, machine-tools and auto parts manufacturer of South Korea
 Sky & Telescope, a magazine
 Strategy & Tactics, a magazine
 S&T (company), an IT company from Austria
 S&T Motors, the former name for KR Motors, a motorcycle manufacturer in South Korea
 Switching and terminal railroad
 Sales and Trading